Dear Relatives (Swedish: Kära släkten) is a 1933 Swedish comedy film directed by Gustaf Molander and starring Gösta Ekman, Tutta Rolf and Carl Barcklind. It was a hit at the box office. It was made at the Råsunda Studios in Stockholm. The film's sets were designed by the art director Arne Åkermark.

Synopsis
The plot revolves around a wealthy wholesaler, his three daughters and their husbands. While two of his sons-in-law are doing very well, but the third is an impoverished nobleman married to his daughter Lilli. They attempt to boost their fortunes by opening a nightclub.

Cast
 Gösta Ekman as 	Claes af Leijonstam
 Tutta Rolf as Lilli af Leijonstam 
 Carl Barcklind as 	Mr. Friis
 Thor Modéen as 	Filip Randel
 Edvin Adolphson as 	Ludwig
 Dora Söderberg as Tyra
 Sickan Carlsson as 	Marianne Friis
 Georg Rydeberg as 	Erik Cronskiöld
 Åke Jensen as 	Valdemar Nyström
 Ruth Stevens as 	Sally
 Eric Abrahamsson as Karlsson 
 Oscar Byström as 	Adolf 
 Tord Bernheim as Dancing man at Kragknappen 
 Wiola Brunius as Young woman at Kragknappen
 Alice Carlsson as 	Young woman at Kragknappen
 Sigge Fürst as 	Dancing man at Kragknappen 
 Nils Hultgren as Count Cronskiöld's servant

References

Bibliography 
 Elkington, Author Trevor. Transnational Cinema in a Global North: Nordic Cinema in Transition. Wayne State University Press, 2005.
 Wright, Rochelle. The Visible Wall: Jews and Other Ethnic Outsiders in Swedish Film. SIU Press, 1998.

External links 
 

1933 films
Swedish comedy films
1933 comedy films
1930s Swedish-language films
Films directed by Gustaf Molander
Swedish black-and-white films
Swedish films based on plays
1930s Swedish films